Gordon Marshall (born 19 April 1964) is a Scottish professional football coach and former player. Marshall played as a goalkeeper for several clubs, most notably Falkirk, Celtic, Kilmarnock and Motherwell, and in one international match for Scotland.

Playing career

Club
Marshall began his career as a youth player with Tynecastle Boys Club before signing for Rangers in January 1980. He then suffered a broken leg playing for the Ibrox club's reserve side aged 15  and after failing to play for the first-team was sent out on loan to East Stirlingshire. Marshall then signed for Scottish Junior club Broxburn Athletic before returning to the senior ranks in December 1982 with East Fife, before signing for Falkirk and then Celtic in 1991 for £270,000, having turned down a chance to rejoin Rangers when it was made clear he would remain behind Andy Goram in the selection order.

Due to the good form of Packie Bonner at Celtic, Marshall was in and out of the first-team and was eventually sent out on loan for first-team experience to St Mirren and English club Stoke City, where he played thirteen times in the 1993–94 season. It was not until Tommy Burns was appointed Celtic's manager at the start of the 1994–95 season that Marshall was the regular first choice goalkeeper. However, that year he was criticised for an error which led to a goal in a shock loss to Raith Rovers in the 1994 Scottish League Cup Final, while Bonner took the jersey for the 1995 Scottish Cup Final victory, Marshall collecting a medal as an unused substitute.

After seven seasons at Celtic Park, Marshall then signed for Kilmarnock in 1998, after Dragoje Lekovic departed the Rugby Park club halfway through the 1997–98 season. He represented the East Ayrshire club in the UEFA Cup and in the 2001 Scottish League Cup Final, lost to Celtic. Marshall played his last match for Killie at home versus his former club Celtic on 25 May 2003 at the age of 39 and then moved to Motherwell, helping the Steelmen reach the 2005 Scottish League Cup Final, a defeat to Rangers. His final senior appearance came at the start of the following season, a 4–4 draw against Celtic (the young opposing goalkeeper had the same surname – David Marshall is no relation to Gordon, however.)

International
Marshall earned one cap for Scotland versus United States in May 1992.

Coaching career
Marshall left Motherwell in November 2005 to become Hibernian's goalkeeping coach, a position he held until July 2009. He then worked for Alloa Athletic and St Johnstone as a goalkeeping coach before returning to Motherwell in August 2011 as their full-time goalkeeping coach. Marshall then left Fir Park in the close season of 2015 to take up the position of goalkeeping coach at Aberdeen, replacing Jim Leighton. Marshall joined  Queen of the South in the 2022 close season as first-team goalkeeping coach.

Personal life
Marshall's father was also a goalkeeper named Gordon, who mainly played for Hearts, Newcastle United and Arbroath and was capped at under-23 level by England.

Marshall is married with two daughters named Amy and Fay. His younger brother Scott played as a defender with Arsenal, Southampton and Celtic. His sister played basketball and has 58 caps for Scotland.

He trained as a hairdresser as a young man in Edinburgh and indicated he would like to resume the occupation when interviewed by a newspaper in 2019.

Career statistics

Club
Source:

International
Source:

Honours
Falkirk
Scottish First Division winner: 1991

Celtic
Scottish Cup winner: 1995
Scottish League Cup runner-up: 1994

Kilmarnock
Scottish League Cup runner-up: 2001

Motherwell
Scottish League Cup runner-up: 2005

See also
List of footballers in Scotland by number of league appearances (500+)
List of Scottish football families

References

External links
 
 

1964 births
Living people
Association football goalkeepers
Footballers from Edinburgh
Rangers F.C. players
East Fife F.C. players
East Stirlingshire F.C. players
Falkirk F.C. players
Celtic F.C. players
Stoke City F.C. players
St Mirren F.C. players
Kilmarnock F.C. players
Motherwell F.C. players
Hibernian F.C. players
Hibernian F.C. non-playing staff
Motherwell F.C. non-playing staff
Scotland international footballers
Scottish Football League players
Scottish footballers
Scottish Premier League players
English Football League players
St Johnstone F.C. non-playing staff
Aberdeen F.C. non-playing staff